Al-Arba'een Mosque was a historic mosque in the city of Tikrit, Iraq. It contained a shrine for Amr ibn Jundab Al-Ghafari, and another shrine for Sitt Nafisa.

History 

The building dates back to the 5th century AH. The name of the mosque, "Al-Arba'een" (The Forty), is derived from a belief that forty martyrs killed during an Islamic conquest of Tikrit were buried under the mosque, although this claim is contested as reports of the forty graves are weak.

The building was used as an Islamic university in 1262 AD.

Construction 
The mosque building was a square shape, with five domes. Each side was approximately forty-seven meters long. Its dimensions are 36.5 x 35.5 meters. Gravel and plaster were mostly used to construct the building and the two venerated rooms are ten meters tall.

One of these venerated rooms was a shrine that contained a tomb of Amr ibn Jundab Al-Ghafari, a companion of the Rashidun caliph Umar ibn Al-Khattab. There was also a cellar in the building which is believed by locals to house the resting place of a female saint, Sitt Nafisa.

Demolition 
The mosque was destroyed by the Islamic State of Iraq and the Levant in 2014 by explosives. The explosion completely destroyed the shrines but did not damage the rest of the mosque. The surrounding cemetery was damaged.

References 

Mosques in Iraq